This topic covers events and articles related to 2023 in music

Specific locations

African music
American music
Asian music
Australian music
Brazlian music
British music
Canadian music
Chinese music
Czech music
Danish music
European music
Finnish music
French music
German music
Icelandic music
Indonesian music
Irish music
Italian music
Japanese music
Latin music
Malaysian music
Mongolian music
Norwegian music
Philippine music
Polynesian music
Scandinavian music
South Korean music
Swedish music
Taiwanese music
Vietnamese music

Specific genres
Classical
Country
Electronic
Jazz
Latin
Heavy metal
Hip hop
Rock

Albums released

Awards

Bands formed
 8Turn
 Baby Monster
 Mave:
 MiSaMo
 TripleS

Soloist debuts
 Jinyoung
 Hwang Min-hyun
 Shiori Tamai

Bands reformed
The Buggles

Bands disbanded
 Bandage
 Bish
 Brave Girls
 D1ce
 For Tracy Hyde
 Loona Odd Eye Circle
 Momoland
 Panic! at the Disco
 Russkaja

Bands on hiatus
TBD

Deaths

January
 1 
 Gangsta Boo, 43, American rapper (Three 6 Mafia)
 Sebastian Marino, 57, American metal guitarist (Overkill, Anvil)
 Fred White, 67, American funk drummer (Earth, Wind & Fire)
 2 
 Andrew Downes, 72, British classical composer
 Kingsize Taylor, 83, British rock and roll singer and guitarist (Kingsize Taylor and the Dominoes) 
 3
 Joseph Koo, 91, Hong Kong film composer
 Notis Mavroudis, 77, Greek classical guitarist and composer
 Alan Rankine, 64, Scottish post-punk keyboardist and guitarist (The Associates)
 4 
 Zoran Kalezić, 72, Serbian-Montenegrin folk singer
 Beeyar Prasad, 61, Indian film lyricist
 5 
 Mark Capps, 54, American sound engineer
 Gordy Harmon, 79, American R&B and soul singer (The Whispers)
 6
 Jeff Blackburn, 77, American rock guitarist and songwriter (Blackburn & Snow, Moby Grape)
 Danny Kaleikini, 85, American Hawaiian pop singer
 7 – Aleksandr Kharchikov, 73, Russian folk singer-songwriter
 8 – Slim Newton, 90, Australian country music singer-songwriter
 9 
 Séamus Begley, 73, Irish folk fiddler and accordionist
 Magnar Mangersnes, 84, Norwegian classical organist and choral conductor
 Yoriaki Matsudaira, 91, Japanese classical composer
 10
 Jeff Beck, 78, British rock guitarist (The Yardbirds, The Jeff Beck Group, Beck, Bogert & Appice, The Honeydrippers)
 Dennis Budimir, 84, American jazz and rock guitarist (The Wrecking Crew)
 José Evangelista, 79, Spanish classical composer
 11 – Yukihiro Takahashi, 70, Japanese electronic and rock drummer and singer (Yellow Magic Orchestra, Sadistic Mika Band, METAFIVE)
 12
 Robbie Bachman, 69, Canadian rock drummer (Bachman-Turner Overdrive)
 Lisa Marie Presley, 54, American country rock singer-songwriter
 13
 Keith Beaton, 72, American R&B singer (Blue Magic)
 Ray Cordeiro, 98, Hong Kong disc jockey (RTHK Radio 3)
 14 – Matthias Carras, 58, German pop singer
 15
 Doris, 75, Swedish pop singer
 Bruce Gowers, 82, British music video director
 C. J. Harris, 31, American country singer
 Vakhtang Kikabidze, 84, Georgian singer
 16 – Johnny Powers, American rockabilly singer and guitarist
 17
  Van Conner, 55, American alternative rock bassist (Screaming Trees)
 Manana Doijashvili, 75, Georgian classical pianist 
 Leon Dubinsky, 81, Canadian folk composer
 Renée Geyer, 69, Australian pop singer
 Larry Morris, 75, New Zealand garage rock singer (Larry's Rebels)
 Richard Oesterreicher, 90, Austrian jazz guitarist and conductor
 18
 David Crosby, 81, American folk rock singer-songwriter (The Byrds, Crosby, Stills, Nash & Young)
 Victor Rasgado, 63, Mexican classical pianist and composer
 Gary Smith, American record producer (death announced on this date)
 Marcel Zanini, 99, Turkish-born French jazz clarinetist
 19 – Alex Napier, 75, English hard rock drummer (Uriah Heep)
 20 
 Stella Chiweshe, 76, Zimbabwean folk mbira player
 Loïc Guguen, French opera singer
 21 – B.G., the Prince of Rap, 57, American rapper
 22 
 Easley Blackwood Jr., 89, American classical and electronic composer and pianist
 Lin Brehmer, 68, American disc jockey and radio personality (WXRT)
 Zhanna Pliyeva, 73, Georgian classical composer and pianist
 23
 Carol Sloane, 85, American jazz singer
 Top Topham, 75, English blues rock guitarist (The Yardbirds)
 26
 Dean Daughtry, 76, American rock keyboardist (The Candymen, Classics IV, Atlanta Rhythm Section)
 Peter McCann, 74, American songwriter and singer
 27 – Floyd Sneed, 80, Canadian rock drummer (Three Dog Night)
 28
 Odd Børre, 83, Norwegian pop singer
 David Challinor, Australian indie rock singer-songwriter and guitarist (Sounds Like Sunset)
 Barrett Strong, 81, American R&B singer-songwriter
 Tom Verlaine, 73, American art punk singer-songwriter and guitarist (Television)
 29 
 Heddy Lester, 72, Dutch pop singer
 Gabriel Tacchino, 88, French classical pianist
 31 
 Donnie Marsico, 68, American rock singer (The Jaggerz)
 Charlie Thomas, 85, American R&B singer (The Drifters)

February
 1 
 Lucy Quintero, 74, Panamanian folk singer
 George Zukerman, 95, Canadian classical bassoonist
 2 
 Butch Miles, 78, American jazz drummer
 Tim Quy, 61, English post-punk percussionist and keyboardist (Cardiacs)
 3 – Paul Janovitz, 54, American alternative rock singer and guitarist (Cold Water Flat)
 4 – Vani Jairam, 77, Indian playback singer
 5 – Lillian Walker, 78, American R&B singer (The Exciters)
 6 – Phil Spalding, 65, English rock bassist (GTR, Original Mirrors, Toyah) (death announced on this date)
 7 
 Mendelson Joe, 78, Canadian folk singer-songwriter
 Steve Sostak, 49, American experimental rock singer and saxophonist (Sweep the Leg Johnny) (death announced on this date)
 8 
 Burt Bacharach, 94, American pop songwriter and composer
 Dennis Lotis, 97, South African-born British swing singer 
 10 – AKA, 35, South African rapper
 11 – Tito Fernández, 80, Chilean folk singer-songwriter
 12 – David Jude Jolicoeur, 54, American rapper (De La Soul)
 13 
 Tim Aymar, 59, American progressive metal singer (Pharaoh, Control Denied)
 Guido Basso, 85, Canadian jazz trumpeter
 Alain Goraguer, 91, French jazz pianist, arranger and composer
 Huey "Piano" Smith, 89, American R&B pianist
 Spencer Wiggins, 81, American soul singer
 14
 Friedrich Cerha, 96, Austrian classical composter and conductor
 Peter Renkens, 55, Belgian new beat singer (Confetti's) (death announced on this date)
 Akira Tsuneoka, 51, Japanese pop punk drummer (Hi-Standard)
 15 – Raquel Welch, 82, American dance singer
 16 
 Chuck Jackson, 85, American R&B singer
 Michael Kupper, 65, German heavy metal guitarist (Running Wild)
 Maon Kurosaki, 35, Japanese pop singer
 Marilú, 95, Mexican bolero singer
 Tony Marshall, 85, German schlager and opera singer
 Alberto Radius, 80, Italian pop rock guitarist and singer-songwriter (Formula 3)
 17
 Otis Barthoulameu, American pop punk singer and guitarist (Fluf, Olivelawn) (death announced on this date)
 Jerry Dodgion, 90, American jazz saxophonist and flautist
 Gerald Fried, 95, American film and television composer
 Kyle Jacobs, 49, American songwriter
 Vijay Kichlu, 92, Indian classical singer
 Hans Poulsen, 77, Australian soft rock singer-songwriter
 Tom Whitlock, American pop rock songwriter
 19 – Davis Causey, 74, American Southern rock guitarist (Sea Level)
 20
 Bruce Barthol, 75, American psychedelic rock bassist (Country Joe and the Fish)
 Victor Brox, 81, English blues singer
 Lyubomyr Futorsky, 50, Ukrainian rock singer (Dead Rooster)
 21 
 Ron Altbach, 76, American rock keyboardist (King Harvest, Celebration)
 Jesse Gress, 67, American rock guitarist
 23 
 Slim Borgudd, 76, Swedish rock drummer (Lea Riders Group)
 Junnosuke Kuroda, 34, Japanese rock guitarist (Sumika)
 25 – Walter Ferguson, 103, Panamanian-born Costa Rican calypso singer-songwriter
 27 – Ismaïla Touré, 73, Senegalese Mbalax singer and percussionist (Touré Kunda)

March
 1 
 Wally Fawkes, 98, British-Canadian jazz clarinettist 
 Leon Hughes, 92, American rhythm and blues singer (The Coasters)
 Neela Ramgopal, 87, Indian Carnatic singer
 Irma Serrano, 89, Mexican ranchero and corrido singer
 2 
 Steve Mackey, 56, British indie rock bassist (Pulp) and record producer
 Wayne Shorter, 89, American jazz saxophonist (Miles Davis Quintet, Weather Report, The Jazz Messengers) (death announced on this date)
 Gothart Stier, 84, German classical singer, organist and conductor
 3 
 David Lindley, 78, American singer-songwriter and guitarist (Kaleidoscope)
 Calvin Newton, 93, American gospel singer (The Oak Ridge Boys, Sons of Song)
 4 
 Sueli Costa, 79, Brazilian MPB composer and singer
 Robert Haimer, 69, American comedy rock singer-songwriter (Barnes & Barnes)
 Michael Rhodes, 69, American country bassist (The Notorious Cherry Bombs)
 Spot, 72, American record producer and engineer
 5 
 Arif Cooper, Jamaican reggae DJ and multi-instrumentalist
 Gary Rossington, 71, American Southern rock guitarist (Lynyrd Skynyrd, Rossington Collins Band)
 6 – Eric Alan Livingston, 38, American experimental metal multi-instrumentalist
 7 – Michael Brimer, 89, South African-Australian classical organist and conductor
 8
 Jim Durkin, 58, American thrash metal guitarist (Dark Angel)
 Josua Madsen, 45, Danish thrash metal drummer (Artillery)
 9 – Robin Lumley, 74, British jazz keyboardist (Brand X)
 10 
 Junior English, 71–72, Jamaican reggae singer
 Napoleon XIV, 84, American novelty singer-songwriter
 11 – Costa Titch, 27, South African rapper
 12 – Marek Kopelent, 90, Czech classical composer
 13
 Simon Emmerson, 67, English jazz and worldbeat guitarist (Weekend, Working Week, Afro Celt Sound System)
 Jim Gordon, 77, American rock drummer (Derek and the Dominos, The Wrecking Crew, Traffic) and songwriter
 Canisso, 57, Brazilian rock bassist (Raimundos)
 14 
 Bobby Caldwell, 71, American singer-songwriter
 Dix Denney, American punk guitarist (The Weirdos, Thelonious Monster) (death announced on this date)
 15 – Théo de Barros, 80, Brazilian jazz multi-instrumentalist and composer (Quarteto Novo)
 16 – Tony Coe, 88, English jazz clarinetist and saxophonist 
 17 
 Fuzzy Haskins, 81, American R&B and funk singer (Parliament-Funkadelic, The Parliaments)
 Fito Olivares, 75, Mexican cumbia saxophonist.
 Mick Slattery, 77, British space rock guitarist (Hawkwind).

See also

Timeline of musical events
Women in music

References

 
2023-related lists 
Music by year
Culture-related timelines by year